Ali Bin Hamad al-Attiyah Arena, is an indoor sports arena in Doha, Qatar. It was built for the Qatar Olympic Committee, in order to host the 2015 World Men's Handball Championship.

After the tournament, the management of the arena was transferred to Al-Sadd Sports Club, to become the home venue for Al Sadd Handball Team.

International sports events
The arena has hosted the following international sports events:
2015 World Men's Handball Championship
2015 AIBA World Boxing Championships
2016 Futsal Intercontinental Cup
2016 ITTF World Tour Grand Finals
2016 FIDE World Rapid and Blitz Championships

References

Indoor arenas in Qatar
Handball venues in Qatar